The David Pakman Show (TDPS), originally Midweek Politics with David Pakman, is a progressive news talk show currently airing on television, radio, and the Internet, hosted by David Pakman.

The program first aired in August 2005 on WXOJ-LP, a radio station located in Northampton, Massachusetts, later being nationally syndicated, and eventually achieving broader international distribution in a number of countries, as well as online.

The show is made up of both live and pre-recorded interviews, clips from television and radio programs related to politics and current events, segments with correspondents on the street and in public, and other specially produced segments. It focuses on modern North American politics and society, with frequent discussion of economics, science, religion in public life, culture, LGBT rights, capital punishment and crime, policing, the Israeli–Palestinian conflict, North American foreign policy, technology, and other topical issues. The show has drawn criticism for interviewing many fringe or "extremist" personalities, and has been accused of platforming them. Pakman has responded that these interviews expose their opinions to the public, putting them on record, and that he does not simply give them a "platform" to express their views without balance.

History

As Midweek Politics with David Pakman 
Pakman started the radio version of the program at age 21 on Pacifica radio affiliate WXOJ while an undergraduate student at the University of Massachusetts Amherst, during his time as an intern at the Media Education Foundation. Public radio syndication began in 2006 on the Pacifica Radio Network. Initially, a handful of non-commercial talk radio stations broadcast the show in syndication.

The show expanded in 2007 to more public radio stations. Pakman was for a time the youngest syndicated radio host in the United States. The same year, Louis Motamedi, a childhood friend of Pakman's, was added as radio producer.

In 2009, The David Pakman Show added its first commercial radio affiliates, starting with Green 1640 in Atlanta, Georgia and WHMP Northampton, Massachusetts. On September 2, Midweek Politics, a simultaneously-produced television show, was launched, originally offered to public-access television stations across the country as well as published on the show's YouTube Channel. The number of television affiliates grew and Pakman attributed this to expanding from radio to a visual medium. Pakman's brother, Natan Pakman, became the program's television director in September 2009.

As The David Pakman Show 

In 2010, the show launched a paid membership program maintaining the podcast at no charge, but offering subscribers extra show segments, behind-the-scenes interviews, and access to show archives. In July of that year, the show obtained national television distribution through Free Speech TV. The show's first international affiliate, Öppna Kanalen Skövde in Skövde, Sweden, announced in September 2010 that it would be airing the program. At the same time, the show was moved from WXOJ to its own studio in Northampton, Massachusetts, for both the radio and television versions. The name was then changed to The David Pakman Show, expanding from a weekly program to two episodes per week, broadcast live on Mondays and Thursdays at 3pm Eastern Standard Time.

Shortly after a broadcast on April 28, 2010, visitors to the show's website began to observe that the site was not functioning properly, and sometimes was inaccessible altogether. Denial of service attacks continued, eventually taking the site offline for two days. On the May 12, 2010, broadcast, Pakman announced that the website had indeed been in the target of unknown deliberate malicious attacks starting immediately after the April 28, 2010, broadcast. Pakman did not indicate the specifics of who was suspected to be involved, but said a more detailed investigation was underway, and alluded to a connection between a guest on the program between April 28 and May 12.

In August 2012, the show moved from a studio in Northampton, Massachusetts to a studio housed on the campus of Greenfield Community College in Greenfield, Massachusetts.

In March 2012, the show announced an expansion to four episodes per week, Monday-Thursday, and a move to an earlier live broadcast time, 2pm EST. The same year, the show joined The Young Turks network, although it has since left the network. New content and video versions of existing radio programming were produced, including Liberal Oasis Radio Show hosted by blogger Bill Scher, Take Action News with David Shuster, television journalist, and World View with Denis Campbell, Editor-in-Chief of UK Progressive Magazine. As of October 2013, only Word View with Dennis Campbell was being actively produced by The David Pakman Show, and as of January 2014, it had stopped all production of ancillary content.

By the beginning of 2013, The David Pakman Show had on its YouTube channel over 25,000 subscribers and 20 million views.

In August 2013, the show moved from Greenfield, Massachusetts to New York City, where the program's main studio was housed until May 2015. Concurrently, producer Louis Motamedi moved to Austin, Texas, where he launched the Austin bureau of The David Pakman Show. Motamedi's role on the program remained unchanged, including serving as co-host, producer, and host of the members only Bonus Show. In 2014 the show expanded to a full 5 shows/week.

By early 2015, the show had 100,000 subscribers on YouTube. In November of that year, the show moved to a new location in Boston, Massachusetts, with Motamedi returning to Massachusetts to produce the show in-studio. The new location was also the studio of similar progressive-independent program The Benjamin Dixon Show whose host Benjamin Dixon would regularly later fill in for David while he would travel to various political events, and also co-hosted live coverage of the election night on November 8, 2016.

During the general election season of 2016, The David Pakman Show YouTube channel passed a quarter-million subscribers and 200 million views.

On August 15, 2016, it was announced that producer Louis Motamedi would be leaving the show, in search of a better living environment in the southern United States. His last day on the program (other than later call-in appearances) was August 26, 2016. Temporary producer Jason Shepherd filled in during September, and Patrick Ford became Louis' successor thereafter, becoming the new producer. David returned to hosting the Bonus Show himself. Segment producer Rachel Gordon was also added to appear on a few episodes per week, adding a female co-host to the show for a short while.

As of late 2019, producer Patrick Ford hosts the Bonus Show on Fridays, while the main show is hosted by David, with Patrick joining into discussions in the other daily bonus shows.

In November 2020 the show moved back to New York City.

Content 
The David Pakman Show is a progressive talk radio program.

Pakman is a strong supporter of same-sex marriage, a topic which has often provoked conflict with guests on the program. Pakman has regularly indicated that the more outrageous, extreme guests are not only interesting to interview, but create the most interest and engagement on behalf of the audience, and that he often interviews people who "would be classified as 'extremists.'"

Glenn Miller 
In April 2010, white supremacist Glenn Miller appeared on Midweek Politics. During the interview, Miller espoused a number of anti-Semitic conspiracy theories and openly insulted Pakman using antisemitic slur. Miller also stated that Adolf Hitler was a "great man" and expressed disappointment that Hitler had not ultimately succeeded in the Holocaust. Snippets of the interview spread throughout the internet, garnering varied reactions. On the following program, Pakman responded to the controversy.

On April 13, 2014, Miller was arrested as the prime suspect in the Overland Park Jewish Community Center shooting. This arrest led to a frenzy of media interest, with Pakman and the original interview featured on CNN, The Huffington Post, The Boston Herald, Mother Jones, Raw Story, Democracy Now, WGGB-TV, and Minneapolis radio station AM950.

Miller was later found guilty of capital murder, and was sentenced to death by lethal injection.

Paul Cameron 
During an interview with Paul Cameron, the anti-gay psychologist and sex researcher, Cameron cited a study conducted by his Family Research Institute which reported that gays and lesbians in the military are far more likely to rape or sexually abuse fellow soldiers.

Westboro Baptist Church live hack 
Members of the Westboro Baptist Church have been interviewed many times on the show, including one incident in which Jake Davis, then only known as "Topiary", announced a live hacking attack on the church's website during a group interview with church spokesperson Shirley Phelps-Roper.

Chaplain Gordon Klingenschmitt 
Former Navy Chaplain Gordon Klingenschmitt, who has expressed anti-gay positions, has appeared on The David Pakman Show. He was honorably but involuntarily discharged from the Navy after a court-martial proceeding for refusing an order not to appear in uniform at political events to "pray in Jesus' name". During a notable appearance, Klingenschmitt debated Jonathan Phelps, of the anti-gay Westboro Baptist Church. The interview drew media coverage due to the fact that both men held anti-gay positions, but disagreed on the reasons why being homosexuality was wrong. Klingenschmitt is also known for his efforts to shut down the YouTube channel of one of his most vocal critics, Right Wing Watch, which uses video clips of his statements.

Gamergate 
Starting in October 2014, Pakman conducted a series of interviews with people involved in Gamergate. People interviewed included game commentator John "TotalBiscuit" Bain, then-8chan owner Fredrick Brennan and game developer Brianna Wu, among others.

Reception 
Arthur Chu has criticized Pakman, arguing that Pakman indulges in sensationalistic "clickbaiting" and platforms people who otherwise would not have one.

The David Pakman Show YouTube channel has been covered in reporting on the YouTube demonetization crisis, known colloquially as the "Adpocalypse".

References

External links 
 
 
 

American talk radio programs
2005 radio programme debuts
American television talk shows
Progressive talk radio
2000s American radio programs
2010 American television series debuts
2010s American television news shows
2020s American television news shows
Liberalism in the United States